A street light is a raised source of light used to illuminate streets and their surrounding area.

Streetlight or Streetlights may also refer to:

 Street Light (painting), a 1909 painting by futurist Giacomo Balla
 "Streetlight", a song by The Getaway Plan
 "Street light", a song by Die Antwoord from their album Mount Ninji and Da Nice Time Kid 
 Streetlight, a film by Sankar

 Streetlights (Bonnie Raitt album), a 1974 album, or its title track
 Streetlights (Kurupt album), a 2010 album, or its title track
 Street Lights (film), 2018
 "Street Lights" (Kanye West song), 2008

See also
 
 
 Street light interference phenomenon, a paranormal phenomenon
 Streetlight effect, a type of observational bias